Mount Pisgah is an unincorporated community in Catoosa County, in the U.S. state of Georgia.

Etymology
The community probably took the name of a local church. The name ultimately is derived from Mount Pisgah, a place mentioned in the Hebrew Bible.

References

Unincorporated communities in Catoosa County, Georgia
Unincorporated communities in Georgia (U.S. state)